Taulia is a financial technology business that provides supply chain finance and dynamic discounting services. Headquartered in San Francisco, Taulia has multiple offices in the United States, as well as the United Kingdom, Germany, Bulgaria, China, Singapore and Australia.

History

The foundation of Taulia 
Taulia was founded in 2009  by CEO Bertram Meyer, CPO Markus Ament, CTO Philip Stehlik and General Manager of Germany Martin Quensel.

New CEO and expansion 
In 2015, Cedric Bru became CEO succeeding Bertram Meyer. 3 years later, in 2018, Taulia announced that more than $1 billion worth of invoices had been accelerated through its platform in 1 day. In 2018, Taulia announced its expansion into APAC.

Acquisition by SAP 
On January 27, 2022, SAP announced its intent to acquire Taulia for an undisclosed amount. The acquisition was completed on March 10, 2022.

Customers 
As of 2022, Taulia serves customers globally in over 160 countries. Customers include AstraZeneca, Halliburton, Airbus, Honda, and NatWest.

Investors 

J.P. Morgan
SAP

References 

Companies based in San Francisco
Financial technology companies
Financial services companies established in 2009
American companies established in 2009
2022 mergers and acquisitions
SAP SE acquisitions
American subsidiaries of foreign companies
Supply chain management